The untitled album by Zoviet France, also known as hessian, the hessian album, the burlap album or OK Boys, is the second commercial music album release by the British avant-garde music group Zoviet France. Recorded in December 1981, it was the first released in 1982 in 12-inch vinyl album format by the British record label Red Rhino Records. A re-edited version was released in 1985 by Red Rhino Records, and then re-released by the British label Charrm in 12-inch vinyl album and CD formats (UK, 1990). The vinyl album versions are significant for being packaged in custom made screenprinted hessian (burlap) bags. The CD version is different from the vinyl versions in featuring an extended version of the last track, "Ji Boys".

Production details

1982 edition
Label: Red Rhino Records (UK)
Catalogue number: RED12
Format: 12 inch vinyl album with hand made sleeve (manually screenprinted hessian bags)
Artwork: original artwork and design by :$OVIET:FRANCE:
Total running time: 00:25:17

1985 edition
Label: Red Rhino Records (UK)
Catalogue number: RED12
Format: 12 inch vinyl album with hand made sleeve (manually screenprinted hessian bags)
Artwork: original artwork and design by :$OVIET:FRANCE:
Total running time: 00:25:17

1990 edition
Label: Charrm (UK)
Catalogue numbers: CHARRMLP2 (12 inch vinyl); CHARRMCD2 (CD)
CD EAN: 5016266900225
Formats: 12 inch vinyl album with commercially manufactured sleeve (screenprinted hessian bags); audio CD with commercially printed inlay and traycard
Artwork: original artwork and design by :$OVIET:FRANCE:
Total running time: 00:32:30

Track listing 

Side one of 12-inch vinyl formats
 "Ritual"
 "Mudbast Boys"
 "Sem Boys"
 "Bring Hessa"

Side two of 12-inch vinyl formats
 "Mounw"
 "Ji Boys"

References 

1982 albums
1985 albums
1990 albums